The large moth family Crambidae contains the following genera beginning with "Y":

Yezobotys

References 

 Y
Crambid